Hans Otto Löwenstein (1881–1931) was an Austrian film director and screenwriter of the silent era.

Selected filmography
 Emperor Charles (1921)
 The Ragpicker of Paris (1922)
 Modern Marriages (1924)
 Colonel Redl (1925)
 Kissing Is No Sin (1926)
 Grandstand for General Staff (1926)
 The Life of Beethoven (1927)
 Madame Dares an Escapade (1927)
 Endangered Girls (1928)

References

Bibliography
 Zipes, Jack. The Enchanted Screen: The Unknown History of Fairy-Tale Films. Routledge, 2011.

External links

1881 births
1931 deaths
Austrian film directors
Austrian male screenwriters
20th-century Austrian screenwriters
20th-century Austrian male writers